Zophodia nephelepasa is a species of snout moth in the genus Zophodia. It was described by Harrison Gray Dyar Jr. in 1919. It is found in Mexico.

There are probably two generations per year.

The larvae feed on Opuntia species, including Opuntia tomentosa, Opuntia streptacantha, Opuntia robusta and Opuntia cantabrigiensis species.

References

Moths described in 1919
Phycitini